Guthrie is an unincorporated community in Dix Township, Ford County, Illinois, United States. It is situated along Illinois Route 54, between Melvin and Gibson City.

History

Guthrie was established about 1876 as an Illinois Central Railroad station, and was named after a director of the railroad. The station closed in 1932.
The Guthrie Post Office was established on May 22, 1876, and closed on September 30, 1952.
Guthrie was platted in 1892.

References

Unincorporated communities in Illinois
Unincorporated communities in Ford County, Illinois